The 1932 United States presidential election in Connecticut took place on November 8, 1932, as part of the 1932 United States presidential election which was held throughout all contemporary 48 states. Voters chose eight representatives, or electors to the Electoral College, who voted for president and vice president. 

Connecticut voted for the Republican nominee, incumbent President Herbert Hoover of California, over the Democratic nominee, Governor Franklin D. Roosevelt of New York. Hoover's running mate was incumbent Vice President Charles Curtis of Kansas, while Roosevelt ran with incumbent Speaker of the House John Nance Garner of Texas.

Hoover won Connecticut by a very narrow margin of 1.14%. Connecticut was 1 of only 6 states, 4 of them in New England, which voted to re-elect the embattled Republican incumbent Hoover, who was widely unpopular over his failure to adequately address the Great Depression.

Despite the massive nationwide shift towards Democrats, Hoover managed to flip the town of Marlborough, which voted for Democrats Al Smith in 1928 and John W. Davis in 1924, both of whom lost by landslide margins. Marlborough was the only town in Connecticut and one of only a few places in the nation to flip from Democratic to Republican in 1932.

As of 2022, this is the most recent election where Connecticut voted more Republican than Kansas.

Results

By county

See also
 United States presidential elections in Connecticut

References

Connecticut
1932
1932 Connecticut elections